Dame Laura Rebecca Kenny, Lady Kenny, OLY ( Trott; born 24 April 1992) is a British professional track and road cyclist who specialises in track endurance events, specifically the team pursuit, omnium, scratch race, elimination race and madison disciplines. With six Olympic medals, having won both the team pursuit and the omnium at both the 2012 and 2016 Olympics and madison at the 2020 Olympics, along with a silver medal from the team pursuit at the 2020 Olympics, she is both the most successful female cyclist, and the most successful British female athlete, in Olympic history.

Her husband, fellow British track cyclist Sir Jason Kenny, holds the same national and Olympic achievement on the male side, and together they are the most successful married couple in Olympic history where both spouses have won at least one gold medal (with 12 gold and three silver medals between them).

Since first appearing at the European Track Championships in 2010, she has won seven World Championship, 14 European Championship and two Commonwealth Games titles, as part of a total of 34 medals. On the road, Kenny won the British National Road Race Championships in 2014, taking the under-23 title in the same race, but has not competed since 2015.

Early life

Kenny was born a month prematurely in Harlow in Essex with a collapsed lung and was later diagnosed with asthma. She was advised by doctors to take up sport in order to regulate her breathing. She enjoyed and competed in trampolining but had to give up due to respiratory problems. She grew up in Cheshunt in Hertfordshire, where she attended Turnford School. Her older sister Emma Trott is a former road racing cyclist. She is an avid supporter of Tottenham Hotspur F.C.
She began in the sport together with her sister when they rode alongside their mother who had taken up cycling in order to lose weight.

Career

She won two junior titles at both the 2009 and 2010 British National Track Championships, and placed third in the individual pursuit at the latter to win a place in the 2010 European Track Championships team pursuit squad aged just 18. After winning gold at the Euros, she went on to take her first world title at the 2011 championships, again as part of the team pursuit squad. In the run-up to the 2012 Olympics she won a further two World and two European golds, in both the team pursuit and the omnium, before securing her place in the Great Britain team as those events made their Olympic debut.
At the 2012 Summer Olympics, Kenny won a gold medal in the team pursuit with Dani King and Joanna Rowsell. The team set a world record time of 3:14.051 in this event. Including pre-Olympics races and the Olympics final itself, in the six times they had ridden together they had broken the world record in every race. She also won gold in the omnium, two days after winning gold in the team pursuit.
For the 2012 road season, Kenny joined Team Ibis Cycles, though she competed in only five races. 2013 saw her increase her road racing commitments with new team Wiggle Honda. Her best result was a second place at the British National Road Race Championships, bringing her the under-23 title, though her road racing was intended to function in service of her track preparation, rather than replacing it. Kenny took further World and European team pursuit gold medals at the 2013 and 2014 championships, as well as European ominium title and World ominium silver in both those years. After making the 2014 Commonwealth Games in Glasgow her focus for this period, she entered the games with a kidney infection and finished well down the field in the scratch race and individual pursuit. Recovering as the Games progressed, she won a gold medal for England, in the points race. On the road she went one better at the national road championships, winning the title for her first senior road race win.

In February 2015, Kenny failed to win a title at the World Championships for the first time in her career, finishing second in both the team pursuit and omnium. The result was part of a poor Championships for Britain, with the team finishing without a gold for the first time since 2001. Trott moved to the new Matrix Fitness Vulpine team for 2015 as a lead rider, moving to the team in order to better combine her road and track cycling ambitions. After a road season in which her best result was 3rd in National Championships, Trott returned won three gold medals at the 2015 European Championships, in the team pursuit, scratch race and omnium. She followed this with gold medals in the scratch race and omnium at the 2016 World Championships in London, as well as a bronze in the team pursuit.

At the 2016 Olympics Trott was a favourite for the omnium, and with hopes of a medal in the team pursuit. In the team pursuit, Great Britain took gold setting world records in the qualification and final of the tournament, defeating the American world champions in the final. This made Trott the first British woman to win three golds, though this achievement was matched by Charlotte Dujardin the next day. In the Ominium, Trott dominated from the start and finished in the top two in five of the six events, to take a comfortable gold medal and once again become Britain's most successful female Olympian.  Following the end of the track cycling competition at the games, Trott and her fiancé Jason Kenny were lauded in the British press as a 'golden couple', having won five gold medals between them in 2016, to reach a total of ten as a couple.

At the delayed 2020 Tokyo Olympics in the summer of 2021, Kenny and her team-mates took the silver medal in the team pursuit: they briefly held the world record after their ride in the first round before Germany set a faster time in the next heat and secured a place in the gold medal final against Team GB. Germany broke their world record again in the final to win the gold, finishing six seconds ahead of the British team. Kenny and Katie Archibald subsequently went on to become the first Olympic champions in the women's Madison with a dominant performance, winning 10 of the race's 12 sprints and gaining a lap on the field with 20 laps to go to secure a total of 78 points, more than twice the score of the second-placed Danish team. The win made Kenny the first British woman to win golds at three consecutive Olympics, the most successful female cyclist in Olympic history, eclipsing Leontien van Moorsel, and tied her with Charlotte Dujardin for the most Olympic medals won by a British female sportsperson. In the omnium, Kenny's medal hopes suffered a setback in the opening scratch race when she was involved in a multi-rider crash on the penultimate lap. She went on to win the tempo race but could only finish 13th in the elimination race.  After the closing points race she moved up from ninth place to finish sixth in the overall standings. Kenny was subsequently selected as the flag bearer for the British team at the Games' closing ceremony.

Personal life

Trott married track cyclist Jason Kenny at a private ceremony on 24 September 2016. The couple live near Knutsford in Cheshire. Their son was born on 23 August 2017. In November 2021, she suffered a miscarriage at nine weeks, and in January 2022, she underwent a surgery due to ectopic pregnancy. In January 2023, it was announced that she and Kenny were expecting their second child.

Career achievements

Major results
Sources:

Track

2008
 3rd Sprint, National Junior Track Championships
2009
 National Junior Track Championships
1st  Individual pursuit
1st  Points race
2nd 500m time trial
3rd Madison (with Hannah Mayho)
2010
 1st  Team pursuit, UEC European Track Championships
 National Junior Track Championships
1st  Individual pursuit
1st  500m time trial
2nd Points race
2nd Scratch
 1st  National Derny Championships
 3rd Individual pursuit, National Track Championships
2011
 1st  Team pursuit, UCI Track World Championships
 UEC European Track Championships
1st  Team pursuit
1st  Omnium
 UEC European Under-23 Track Championships
1st  Individual pursuit
1st  Scratch
1st  Team pursuit (with Katie Colclough and Dani King)
 2011–12 UCI Track Cycling World Cup, Cali
1st  Team pursuit
3rd  Omnium
 National Track Championships
2nd Individual pursuit
2nd Points race
2nd Scratch
3rd 500m time trial
2012
 Olympic Games
1st  Team pursuit
1st  Omnium
 UCI Track World Championships
1st  Team pursuit
1st  Omnium
 2011–12 UCI Track Cycling World Cup, London
1st  Team pursuit
3rd  Omnium
 2012–13 UCI Track Cycling World Cup, Glasgow
1st  Omnium
1st  Team pursuit
2013
 UCI Track World Championships
1st  Team pursuit
2nd  Omnium
 UEC European Track Championships
1st  Team pursuit
1st  Omnium
 UEC European Under-23 Track Championships
1st  Individual pursuit
1st  Omnium
1st  Points race
 National Track Championships
1st  Team pursuit
1st  Points race
1st  Individual pursuit
1st  Madison
 2013–14 UCI Track Cycling World Cup
1st  Team pursuit, Manchester
1st  Omnium, Manchester
2nd  Omnium, Aguascalientes
 3rd Scratch, Revolution – Round 1, Manchester
2014
 UCI Track World Championships
1st  Team pursuit
2nd  Omnium
 UEC European Track Championships
1st  Team pursuit
1st  Omnium
 1st  Points race, Commonwealth Games
 National Track Championships
1st  Team pursuit
1st  Scratch
2nd Individual pursuit
3rd Points race
 2014–15 UCI Track Cycling World Cup
1st  Team pursuit, Guadalajara
1st  Team pursuit, London
1st  Omnium, London
 Revolution Series
1st Omnium – Round 1, London
1st Points race – Round 4, Manchester
1st Scratch – Round 4, Manchester
1st Omnium – Round 5, London
1st Points race – Round 2, Manchester
3rd Scratch – Round 2, Manchester
 1st Omnium, Fenioux Piste International
2015
 1st  Omnium, 2015–16 UCI Track Cycling World Cup, Aguascalientes
 UEC European Track Championships
1st  Team pursuit
1st  Scratch
1st  Omnium
 National Track Championships
1st  Individual pursuit
1st  Scratch
1st  Points race
 Revolution Series
1st Omnium – Round 1, Derby
1st Points race – Round 2, Manchester
1st Points race – Round 4, Glasgow
1st Points race – Round 5, London
1st Scratch – Round 4, Glasgow
1st Scratch – Round 5, London
2nd Scratch – Round 1, Derby
3rd Individual pursuit – Round 1, Derby
3rd Scratch – Round 6, Manchester
 Grand Prix of Poland
1st Omnium
1st Scratch
 UCI Track World Championships
2nd  Team pursuit
2nd  Omnium
 2nd Omnium, Internationale Radsport Meeting
2016
 Olympic Games
1st  Team pursuit
1st  Omnium
 UCI Track World Championships
1st  Omnium
1st  Scratch
3rd  Team pursuit
 2015–16 UCI Track Cycling World Cup, Hong Kong
1st  Omnium
2nd  Scratch
 1st  National Madison Championships
 Revolution Series
1st Points race - Round 5, Manchester
1st Points race - Round 6, Manchester
1st Scratch - Round 6, Manchester
2nd Scratch - Round 5, Manchester
 1st Omnium, Grand Prix of Poland
 1st Omnium, Fenioux Piste International
 Revolution Champions League
2nd Omnium - Round 2, London
2nd Scratch - Round 2, London
3rd Points race - Round 2, London
2018
 2018–19 UCI Track Cycling World Cup
1st  Omnium, Milton
1st  Team pursuit, Milton
1st  Madison, Berlin (with Emily Nelson)
1st  Team pursuit, Berlin
1st  Madison, London (with Katie Archibald)
1st  Team pursuit, London
 1st  Omnium, National Track Championships
2019
 2019–20 UCI Track Cycling World Cup, Minsk
2nd  Madison (with Emily Nelson)
3rd  Omnium
2020
 1st  Madison, 2019–20 UCI Track Cycling World Cup, Milton (with Neah Evans)
2021
 Olympic Games
1st  Madison (with Katie Archibald)
2nd  Team pursuit
2022
 1st  Scratch race, Commonwealth Games
 2nd  Team pursuit, UCI Track Cycling Nations Cup, Glasgow

Road

2009
 2nd National Criterium Championships
2011
 1st  Road race, National Under-23 Road Championships
2013
 National Road Championships
1st  Under-23 road race
2nd Road race
 1st RideLondon Grand Prix
 4th Grand Prix de Dottignies
2014
 National Road Championships
1st  Road race
1st  Under-23 road race
 1st Overall Surf & Turf 2-Day
1st Stages 1, 2 & 3
2015
 3rd Road race, National Road Championships

Honours and awards

Trott was appointed Officer of the Order of the British Empire (OBE) in the 2013 New Year Honours for services to cycling and Commander of the Order of the British Empire (CBE) in the 2017 New Year Honours, also for services to cycling. Both Laura and Jason Kenny received their CBEs on Tuesday 25 April 2017 at an Investiture in Buckingham Palace. Taken together, Laura and Jason Kenny won 12 Olympic gold medals, which places them among the most successful Olympic medalist families of all time.

She received an Honorary Degree from the University of Essex in 2013.

In 2014, the former Grundy Park Leisure Centre in Cheshunt was renamed The Laura Trott Leisure Centre in her honour following a £4 million redevelopment. Trott attended the launch ahead of competing in stage four of the first Women's Tour from Cheshunt to Welwyn Garden City.

Kenny was appointed Dame Commander of the Order of the British Empire (DBE) in the 2022 New Year Honours for services to cycling. Her husband Jason was knighted in the same list, also for services to cycling. As a result she is styled 'Lady Kenny' because she is the wife of a knight. They were both invested at Windsor Castle on 17 May 2022.

See also

 List of multiple Olympic gold medalists
 List of Olympic medalists in cycling (women)
 2012 Olympics gold post boxes in the United Kingdom
 List of British cyclists

References

External links

Biography at British Cycling
Profile at Team Ibis Cycles website

1992 births
Living people
UCI Track Cycling World Champions (women)
People from Cheshunt
Cyclists at the 2012 Summer Olympics
Cyclists at the 2016 Summer Olympics
Cyclists at the 2020 Summer Olympics
Olympic cyclists of Great Britain
Olympic gold medallists for Great Britain
Olympic silver medallists for Great Britain
Olympic medalists in cycling
English Olympic medallists
English female cyclists
Cyclists at the 2010 Commonwealth Games
Medalists at the 2012 Summer Olympics
Medalists at the 2016 Summer Olympics
Medalists at the 2020 Summer Olympics
Cyclists at the 2014 Commonwealth Games
British cycling road race champions
Commonwealth Games gold medallists for England
Commonwealth Games medallists in cycling
English track cyclists
European Championships (multi-sport event) gold medalists
The Sunday Times Sportswoman of the Year winners
Dames Commander of the Order of the British Empire
Sporting dames
Wives of knights
Cyclists at the 2022 Commonwealth Games
Commonwealth Games competitors for England
Medallists at the 2014 Commonwealth Games
Medallists at the 2022 Commonwealth Games